The Mooresville Moors were a minor league baseball team based in Mooresville, North Carolina. Between 1936 and 1953, the Mooresville Moors teams played as members of the 1936 Carolina League, the North Carolina State League from 1937 to 1942 and 1945 to 1952 before playing a final season in the 1953 Tar Heel League. The Mooresville Moors won six North Carolina State League Championships. For one season, the team became known as the Mooresville "Braves," playing the 1945 season as a minor league affiliate of the Boston Braves. The Moors and Braves hosted minor league home games at Mooresville Park.

Baseball Hall of Fame member Hoyt Wilhelm played for the 1942, 1946 and 1947 Mooresville Moors.

History

Carolina League (1936)
The Mooresville Moors first began minor league play in 1936. The Salisbury Colonials were 2–6 in the first season of the Independent level Carolina League when the franchise moved to Mooresville, North Carolina. Mooresville, North Carolina was awarded the franchise after agreeing to buy the team equipment and honor player contracts. Beginning play at Mooresville Park, the Salisbury/Mooresville team ended the 1936 season with an overall record of 35–64 under manager Jim Poole, placing 7th in the eight–team Carolina League standings. Salisbury originally surrendered its franchise to the league on May 18, 1936.

The Mooresville "Moors" corresponds with local agriculture and industry. The Moor brand Turkish towel was a featured product of local Mooresville cotton mills.

North Carolina League (1937–1942)
After one season of play, the Mooresville Moors left the Carolina League and joined the eight–team Class D North Carolina State League in 1937. The 1937 Mooresville Moors won the first of six championships. The Moors became charter members of the North Carolina State League, playing home games at Mooresville Park. Mooresville had a 1937 regular season record of 74–35 to place 1st in the North Carolina State League regular season standings, capturing the pennant under returning manager Jim Poole and president C.F Clark, as the Moors finished 12.0 games ahead of the 2nd place Thomasville Chair Makers. In the Playoffs, the Mooresville Moors defeated the Landis Sens 3 games to 1. In the Finals, Mooresville defeated the Shelby Cardinals 4 games to 3 to capture the 1937 North Carolina State League Championship. Moors pitcher Joe Rucidio led the league with 20 wins. Mooresville native Tripp Sigman played for the 1937 Moors.

The Mooresville Moors were co–champions of the 1938 North Carolina State League. The Moors the ended the 1938 regular season with a record of 59–53, placing 4th under manager John Hicks, finishing 16.5 games behind the 1st place Thomasville Tommies. In the Playoffs, Mooresville defeated the Shelby/Gastonia Cardinals 3 games to 0. In the Finals, the Mooresville Moors and Thomasville Tommies were tied 3 games to 3. In the 7th game on September 18, 1938, the game was abandoned due to fan violence in Thomasville. Mooresville and Thomasville were declared co–champions.

The 1939 Mooresville Moors were North Carolina State League Champions for the third straight season. In the regular season, the Moors won the league Pennant, ending the 1939 season with a record of 71–38, placing 1st in the North Carolina State League standings under returning manager John Hicks, finishing 7.5 games ahead of the 2nd place Lexington Indians. In the Playoffs, the Moors defeated the Concord Weavers 3 games to 1. In the Finals the Mooresville Moors again played the Thomasville Tommies, winning 4 games to 1. Moors player William Carrier led the league with 92 RBI and teammate Webster Templeton led with 100 runs scored. Pitcher Richard Robinson won 23 games to lead the league. Playing at Mooresville Park, season attendance was 20,093, an average of 369 per game.

The Mooresville Moors placed 4th in the 1940 North Carolina State League regular season standings and advanced to the league Finals. With a regular season record of 60–51 under manager John Hicks. Finishing 4.5 games behind the 1st place Kannapolis Towelers, Mooresville qualified for the Playoffs. In the Playoffs, the Mooresville Moors swept the Salisbury Giants in 3 games. In the Finals, the Lexington Indians won the title, defeating Mooresville 4 games to 1. Norm Small led the North Carolina State League with 25 home runs and 115 RBI.

On May 28, 1941, the Moors released future Baseball Hall of Fame member Hoyt Wilhelm, who had not appeared in a game after signing with the team on May 7, 1941, just four days out of high school. Wilhelm would return to the Moors for three seasons of play, beginning in 1942.

The 1941 Mooresville Moors again advanced to the North Carolina State League finals. The Moors ended the 1941 regular season with a record of 57–43, placing 3rd in the league standings under manager Ginger Watts, finishing 13.0 games behind the 1st place Kannapolis Towelers. The Mooresville Moors defeated the Kannapolis Towelers 3 games to 1 in the playoffs to advance. In the Finals, the Salisbury Giants and Mooresville Moors series went to 7 games, with Salisbury winning the championship.

The Moors finished in a tie for 2nd place in the 1942 North Carolina State League regular season. Mooresville ended the season with a record of 61–39 record under John Hicks, who returned, as Mooresville finished 4.0 games behind the 1st place Concord Weavers in the regular season. In the Playoffs, the Landis Senators swept Mooresville in three games. Norm Small led the league with 32 home runs and 107 RBI and pitcher Harry Jordan had 179 strikeouts to lead the league. At age 19, Baseball Hall of Fame member Hoyt Wilhelm pitched the first of his three seasons for Mooresville in 1942, finishing with a 10–3 record and a 4.25 ERA. After the 1942 season, the North Carolina State League suspended play due to World War II.

North Carolina League (1945–1952)
Mooresville returned to play in the 1945 North Carolina State League. The Mooresville Braves became a minor league affiliate of the Boston Braves for one season. Upon returning to North Carolina State League play, the Braves ended the 1945 season with a record of 51–61, placing 6th in the standings, finishing 28.0 games behind the 1st placeHickory Rebels. Jack Quinlan was the 1945 manager. Braves pitcher Forrest Thompson led the league with 24 wins, a 2.13 ERA and 278 strikeouts.

The franchise returned to the Mooresville "Moors" moniker in 1946 and captured the North Carolina State League Championship. The Moors finished the 1946 season with a 57–52, record, placing 4th in the regular season standings. The Moors finished 19.0 games behind the 1st place Concord Weavers in the regular season, playing under managers Robert Crow and Norm Small. Small led the league with 18 home runs and 100 runs scored, while pitcher Lacy James led the league with 247 strikeouts. In the Playoffs, Mooresville defeated the Landis Millers 4 games to 3. In the Finals the Mooresville Moors won the championship by defeating the Concord Weavers 4 games to 2. Hoyt Wilhelm returned to Mooresville in 1946, pitching to a 21–8 record with a 2.47 ERA. Wilhelm returned after serving in the Army during World War II and earning the Purple Heart. He had been injured, with shrapnel permanently embedded in his back.

Mooresville won another North Carolina State League Championship and pennant in 1947. The Moors captured the pennant as Mooresville finished the regular season with a record of 68–43, placing 1st in the league standings, finishing 4.5 games ahead of the 2nd place Salisbury Pirates, as player/manager Norm Small led the league with 31 home runs. In the Playoffs, Mooresville defeated the Hickory Rebels 4 games to 3 to advance. In the Finals, the Mooresville Moors and Lexington Indians played a 7–game series, with Mooresville capturing the championship. Hoyt Wilhelm finished the season with a record of 20–7 and a 3.36 ERA. Season attendance at Mooresville Park was 39,091 an average of 704 per game. Mooresville was down three games to none to Lexington in the championship series. The Moores then won the next four games, including a 20-1 victory in the deciding seventh game to claim the championship. Hoyt Wilhelm won three of the four games for Mooresville. 

Mooresville placed 5th in the 1948 North Carolina State League season standings and did not qualify for the playoffs. The Moors finished with a record of 57–52, placing 5th in the eight–team league under player/manager Norm Small, who led the North Carolina League with 33 home runs and 130 RBI. Mooresville finished 9.5 games behind the 1st place High Point-Thomasville Hi-Toms in the final regular season standings. Season attendance at Mooresville Park was 33,569.

The 1949 Mooresville Moors ended the 1949 season with a record of 72–52, placing 2nd in the North Carolina State League regular season. Jim Mills was the 1949 manager as the Moors finished 18.0 games behind the 1st place High Point-Thomasville Hi-Toms. In the Playoffs, the Lexington Indians swept Mooresville in four games. Lester Bringle of Mooresville led the North Carolina State League with 21 wins. Attendance at Mooresville Park for the season was 37,414.

Mooresville placed 2nd in the 1950 North Carolina State League regular season standings for the second consecutive season. The Moors ended the 1950 season with a record of 64–47 under returning manager Jim Mills, finishing 3.5 games behind the 1st place Salisbury Pirates. In the Playoffs, the High Point-Thomasville Hi-Toms defeated Mooresville Moors 4 games to 2. Season attendance for home games at Mooresville Park was 32,798.

The Mooresville Moors finished with a record 55–71 in 1951 and did not qualify for the Playoffs. Mooresville placed 7th in the North Carolina State League regular season standings under managers Tuck McWilliams and Jim Mills. Mooresville finished 35.0 games behind the 1st place High Point-Thomasville Hi-Toms in the regular season standings. Season home attendance was 18,666, an average of 296 per game.

The 1952 Mooresville Moors were the North Carolina State League Champions in the last season of play for the league. Mooresville ended the 1952 regular season with a record of 70–39, record to place  2nd under Manager Jim Mills, finishing 5.0 games behind the 1st place High Point-Thomasville Hi-Toms. In the Playoffs, the Mooresville Moors defeated the Elkin Blanketeers 4 games to 1. In the Finals – Mooresville Moors defeated the Salisbury Pirates 4 games to 3 to win their 6th championship. Season attendance at Mooresville Park was 18,241, an average of 335. After the season, the North Carolina State League permanently folded.

Tar Heel League (1953)
In their final season, the 1953 Mooresville Moors became members of the Class D level Tar Heel League. Mooresville ended the regular season with a record of 58–55, placing 5th under manager Jim Mills, finishing 18.0 games behind the 1st place Marion Marauders.  Season attendance at Mooresville Park was 19,413 an average of 344 per contest. The Mooresville franchise folded from the Tar Heel League following the season, as the league reduced to four teams.

Minor league baseball has not returned to Mooresville following the demise of the Moors. Since 2014, Mooresville has hosted the Mooresville Spinners, a collegiate summer baseball team, playing at Moor Park.

The ballpark
For their duration, the Mooresville Moors hosted minor league at home games exclusively at Mooresville Park. The ballpark had a capacity of 2,500 in 1939 and dimensions (Left, Center, Right): of 210–400–330 in 193 and 320–380–325 in 1940. Today, the site is still in use, known as Moor Park. The park and hosts youth teams, as well as the Mooresville Spinners, a collegiate summer baseball team that began play in 2014 as members of the Carolina-Virginia Collegiate League and who today play in the Southern Collegiate Baseball League.  Moor Park is located at 691 South Broad Street.

The former Mooresville Mills/Burlington Industries textile plant that inspired the team moniker was located across from the Mooresville Park. Today, the Merinos Home Furnishings building occupies the former mill complex, near Moor Park. The Mooresville Mill Village Historic District, with homes built to house the factory workers, is adjacent, listed on the National Register of Historic Places.

Timeline

Year–by–year records

Notable alumni

Baseball Hall of Fame alumni

Hoyt Wilhelm (1942, 1946–1947) Inducted, 1985

Notable alumni
Junie Barnes (1940)
Fred Chapman (1952)
Tony Daniels (1942, 1951–1953)
Herman Fink (1941–1942)
Charlie Frye (1937)
Bunny Hearn (1938)
Jim Hopper (1939, 1948)
Dave Jolly (1946–1947)
Garland Lawing (1939)
Jim Lyle (1938)
Jim Poole (1936–1937, MGR)
Tripp Sigman (1937)
Forrest Thompson (1945, 1951)
Ed Walczak (1946–1948)
Eddie Yount (1936)

See also
Mooresville Moors players

References

External links
Baseball Reference

Defunct minor league baseball teams
Baseball teams established in 1936
Baseball teams disestablished in 1953
1936 establishments in North Carolina
Defunct baseball teams in North Carolina
Professional baseball teams in North Carolina
Defunct Carolina League teams
Iredell County, North Carolina
Baseball teams disestablished in 1942
Baseball teams established in 1946
Tar Heel League teams